The 1961 Campeonato Nacional de Fútbol Profesional, was the 29th season of top-flight football in Chile. Universidad Católica won their third title following a 3–2 win against Universidad de Chile in the championship play-off on 5 January 1962, also qualifying for the 1962 Copa de Campeones.

Final table

Results

Championship play-off

Title

Topscorers

See also
1961 Copa Chile Green Cross

Notes

References
RSSSF Page

Primera División de Chile seasons
Chile
1961 in Chilean football